Stephen Bienskie is an American actor and singer, known for his role on the web series Submissions Only.

Career

While trying to find work at the beginning of his acting career, Bienskie worked as a janitor. His earlier gigs include working at a Renaissance Faire and performing with the CBGB's and The Ramones. He went on to be the final Rum Tum Tugger in Cats on Broadway and played Buddy in The Last Session both off-off-Broadway and off-Broadway. He eventually booked the role of Steven Ferrell on the web series Submissions Only, which aired for three seasons between 2010 and 2014. He also played Buffalo Bill in Silence! The Musical and a Greek and a therapist in How to Save the World and Find True Love in 90 Minutes off-Broadway. He has made guest appearances on several shows including Law & Order and Blue Bloods.

Credits

Theatre

Film

Television

Video Games

References

External links

http://www.playbillvault.com/Person/Detail/98207/Stephen-Bienskie
http://submissionsonly.com/whoswho.php

American male stage actors
Living people
Place of birth missing (living people)
Year of birth missing (living people)
American male singers
American male web series actors
21st-century American male actors
20th-century American male actors